Agylla marginata is a moth of the family Erebidae. It was described by Herbert Druce in 1885. It is found in Mexico, Guatemala and Costa Rica.

References

Moths described in 1885
marginata
Moths of North America